SMV may refer to:

People
 Sir Mokshagundam Visvesvaraya, Indian engineer, politician and Diwan of Mysore

In computer science
 Symbolic model verification
 SMV modelling language, used in model checking by the CMU SMV and NuSMV model checkers

Places
 Samedan Airport (Switzerland), IATA airport code SMV
 Santa Maria Valley, an American Viticultural Area in California
 TusPark (Shanghai), or "Shanghai Multimedia Valley" (SMV), or "Tsinghua University Science Park"

Medicine
 Superior mesenteric vein

Other uses
 Boeing X-40 Space Maneuver Vehicle
 Santa Maria Valley Railroad
 Selectable Mode Vocoder
 SigmaTel Motion Video, a proprietary video format
 Slow moving vehicle, a sign used in the United States to warn of vehicles normally operating in traffic at speeds of 25 mph (40 km/h) or less
 SMV (band), a bass supergroup
 Standard Minute Value, a measure of labor costs in industrial engineering predetermined motion time systems
 Star of Military Valour
 Sexual Market Value, a colloquial expression for a person's sexual capital
Sake Meter Value, the English term for Nihonshu-do (日本酒度), a value that indicates the sugar content of a sake based on its relative density
SMV, the home video arm of Sony Music Entertainment.